Aníbal Araújo Capela (born 8 May 1991) is a Portuguese professional footballer who plays as a central defender.

References

External links

1991 births
Living people
People from Vila Verde
Portuguese footballers
Association football defenders
Primeira Liga players
Liga Portugal 2 players
Segunda Divisão players
S.C. Braga players
F.C. Vizela players
S.C. Covilhã players
S.C. Braga B players
Moreirense F.C. players
Associação Académica de Coimbra – O.A.F. players
Rio Ave F.C. players
Serie B players
Serie C players
A.C. Carpi players
Cosenza Calcio players
U.S. Triestina Calcio 1918 players
Portugal youth international footballers
Portugal under-21 international footballers
Portuguese expatriate footballers
Expatriate footballers in Italy
Portuguese expatriate sportspeople in Italy
Sportspeople from Braga District